Fiston Nasser Mwanza Mujila (born 1981, in Lubumbashi) is a Congolese writer. He lives in Graz, Austria, where he teaches African literature.

Biography 
Fiston Mwanza Mujila was the recipient of the gold medal for literature at the 2009 Francophone Games in Lebanon for his text "The Night".

In 2014, Mujila's debut novel, Tram 83, was published by Éditions Métailié to considerable acclaim. In autumn 2015, an English translation (by Roland Glasser) of Tram 83 was published by Deep Vellum Publishing in Dallas, Texas, and received widespread praise.  This translation was also published by Jacaranda Books in the UK and Scribe in Australia and New Zealand. Other translations of Tram 83 have appeared in Italian, Catalan, Dutch, Swedish, Spanish and German. Mujila lives in Graz, Austria.

Mujila was awarded the 2015 Etisalat Prize for Literature on 19 March 2016 for Tram 83, the novel having earlier been announced on the longlist for the Man Booker International Prize, and awarded the Grand Prix of Literary Associations (Belles-Lettres Category) on 26 February 2016. He won the German International Literature Award for Tram 83.

Bibliography 
 Le Fleuve dans le Ventre / Der Fluß im Bauch, poèmes, bilingual edn, translated into German by Ludwig Hartinger, published in Ottensheim an der Donau, Austria by Édition Thanhäuser, 2013, 114 pp.
 Tram 83, Novel, Deep Vellum Publishing (Dallas), 2015, 224 pp.
 Et les moustiques sont des fruits à pépins and Te voir dressé sur tes deux pattes ne fait que mettre de l’huile au feu, Play, Manage, Belgique, Éditions Lansman, 2015, 86 pp. (39 & 36)

See also 
 Grand Prix of Literary Associations
 Grands prix des associations littéraires

References

External links 

 Official Website of Fiston Mwanza Mujila
 "Tram 83, the Congolese novel that's wowing the literary world - extract", The Guardian, 7 January 2016.

1981 births
People from Lubumbashi
21st-century novelists
Democratic Republic of the Congo novelists
Living people
Democratic Republic of the Congo male writers
Male novelists
21st-century male writers
Democratic Republic of the Congo expatriates
21st-century Democratic Republic of the Congo people